Money Money 2020 Part II: We Told Ya So! is the second studio album by American new wave band The Network (a Green Day side project).  It was released on December 4, 2020, and was their first new album after seventeen years, following several weeks of subtle teases by the band via social media and several music videos from the promotional EP, Trans Am.

Background 
The Network had gained a cult following after their brief two-year tenure, during which they released their debut album Money Money 2020, as well as played a few small club shows. In October 2005, they opened for Green Day at two concerts, by which point it had become known that The Network was the alter egos of Green Day. After those two performances, the band went on a fifteen-year hiatus, reemerging in October 2020 with a YouTube video entitled "The Prophecy" (which would also be the first track for their upcoming album).  In the weeks following, a music video was released for the lead single off of Money Money 2020 Part II: We Told Ya So! entitled "Ivankkka Is a Nazi." On November 19, 2020, the band released an EP of four songs from the album, entitled Trans Am. Following the EP's release, the band also revealed the title for the long-awaited sequel to Money Money 2020, and in the week leading to its release they uploaded four videos, each a minute long, every day before the album was released.  Money Money 2020 Part II: We Told Ya So! was released on all streaming platforms on December 4, 2020, along with a preorder for the album on vinyl and CD as well.

Track listing 
The vocals for all songs are performed by their respective writer's alter ego: Billie Joe Armstrong as Fink, Mike Dirnt as Van Gough, and Tré Cool as The Snoo, except for "Pizzagate", which is instrumental, and "Cancer Is the New Black", where both Armstrong and Cool perform the vocals.

Personnel 
 Fink - lead vocals, lead guitar, backing vocals, drums
 Van Gough - lead vocals, bass guitar, backing vocals
 The Snoo - drums, lead vocals
 Balducci - rhythm guitar
 Z - keyboards, keytar, backing vocals
 Captain Underpants - keyboards

References 

2020 albums
The Network albums
Warner Records albums